Annas (also Ananus or Ananias; , ; , ; 23/22 BC – death date unknown, probably around AD 40) was appointed by the Roman legate Quirinius as the first High Priest of the newly formed Roman province of Judaea in AD 6 – just after the Romans had deposed Archelaus, Ethnarch of Judaea, thereby putting Judaea directly under Roman rule.

Annas appears in the Gospels and Passion plays as a high priest before whom Jesus is brought for judgment, prior to being brought before Pontius Pilate.

The sacerdotal family
The terms of Annas, Caiaphas, and the five brothers are:

Ananus (or Annas), son of Seth (6–15)
Annas officially served as High Priest for ten years (AD 6–15), when at the age of 36 he was deposed by the procurator Valerius Gratus. Yet while having been officially removed from office, he remained as one of the nation's most influential political and social individuals, aided greatly by the fact that his five sons and his son-in-law Caiaphas all served at sometime as High Priests. His death is unrecorded. His son Annas the Younger, also known as Ananus the son of Ananus, was assassinated in AD 66 for advocating peace with Rome.

Eleazar ben Ananus (16–17)
After Valerius Gratus deposed Ishmael ben Fabus from the high priesthood, he installed Eleazar ben Ananus, (15—16), a descendant of John Hyrcanus. It was a time of turbulence in Jewish politics, with the role of the high priesthood being contended for by several priestly families. Eleazar was likewise deposed by Gratus, who gave the office to Simon ben Camithus(17—18).

Caiaphas (18–36)
Properly called Joseph, son of Caiaphas, he was married to the daughter of Annas (John 18:13). Gratus made him high priest after depriving Simon ben Camithus of the office.  The comparatively long eighteen-year tenure of Caiaphas suggests he had established a good working relationship with the Roman authorities. Gratus' successor Pontius Pilate retained him as high priest.

Jonathan ben Ananus (36–37 and 44)

Theophilus ben Ananus (37–41)

Matthias ben Ananus (43)

Ananus ben Ananus (63)

References in the Mosaic Law to "the death of the high priest" suggest that the high-priesthood was ordinarily held for life. Perhaps for this reason, Annas was still called "high priest" even after his dismissal, along with Caiaphas (Luke 3:2). He also may have been acting as president of the Sanhedrin, or a coadjutor of the high priest.

In the New Testament

The plot to kill Lazarus of Bethany
Although Annas is not mentioned by name in the plot to kill Lazarus, several 19th-century writers such as Johann Nepomuk Sepp and the Abbé Drioux, considered that there may be a concealed reference to Annas in the parable of the Rich Man and Lazarus which points at a "rich man" with five brothers. In support of this is the coincidence that the father and five brothers who will not be convinced even if the parable Lazarus is raised from the dead predict that Caiaphas, Annas, and the five sons of Annas would not believe and plotted to have the real Lazarus killed when he was raised.

The trial of Jesus
Although Caiaphas was the properly appointed high priest, Annas, being his father-in-law and a former incumbent of the office, undoubtedly exercised a great deal of the power attached to the position. According to the Gospel of John (the event is not mentioned in other accounts), Jesus was first brought before Annas, whose palace was closer. Annas questioned him regarding his disciples and teaching, and then sent him on to Caiaphas, where some members of the Sanhedrin had met, and where in Matthew's account the first trial of Jesus took place.

In the Book of Acts
After Pentecost, Annas presided over the Sanhedrin before which the Apostles Peter and John were brought.

Cultural references
Annas has an important role in Jesus Christ Superstar, as one of the two main antagonists of the show (the other being Caiaphas) spurring Pontius Pilate to take action against Jesus. In almost all versions, Annas has a very high voice (almost reaching falsetto) to contrast against Caiaphas' bass. Despite being Caiaphas' father-in-law, Annas is generally played by a younger actor.

See also
 List of biblical figures identified in extra-biblical sources

References

External links

 

1st-century High Priests of Israel
People in the canonical gospels
People in Acts of the Apostles